Ramon Villarosa Mitra Jr. (February 4, 1928 – March 20, 2000) was a Filipino statesman, diplomat, and pro-democracy activist. He served as Speaker of the House of Representatives of the Philippines from 1987 to 1992. Prior to that, he was Corazon Aquino's first minister of Agriculture from 1986 to 1987, a member of the Batasang Pambansa from 1984 to 1986 and a senator during the 7th Congress.

Early life and career
Mitra was born on February 4, 1928, inside the Iwahig Penal Colony in Puerto Princesa, Palawan to Ramon Mitra and Purification Villarosa. At the time of his birth, his father was the superintendent of the penal colony. He attended public school for elementary education and took his secondary education in San Beda College. He finished his degree in liberal arts in Baguio and obtained his Bachelor of Laws in San Beda College.

Mitra was a foreign service officer in Washington, D.C., and at the United Nations from 1954 to 1961. In 1961, he was special assistant to the Office of the President. He then became a senior technical assistant to the Manila mayor's office from 1962 to 1965.

Political life

Representative (1965–1971) 
Mitra's political career began when he ran and won a seat in the House of Representatives representing Palawan's at-large congressional district during the 1965 general election. He ran again for a second term in 1969 but was cut short following his resignation in 1971 to run for the Senate. During his first stint in the House, he was the minority leader for five years.

Senator of the Philippines (1971–1972) 
Mitra was one of the eight candidates fielded by the Liberal Party for the 1971 Senate election. In August 1971, during a campaign rally held in Plaza Miranda to proclaim their candidacies, a deadly bombing occurred which caused 9 deaths and injured 95, including Mitra. He acquired 32 shrapnel wounds and 13 shrapnel buried in his body.

He won sixth place in the election earning around 3 million votes. In September 1972, his term was cut short by martial law and was subsequently arrested. He was one of the first arrested and jailed when Ferdinand Marcos declared martial law.

Assemblyman (1984–1986) 
In 1978, Mitra unsuccessfully ran for the Interim Batasang Pambansa together with former Senator Ninoy Aquino. In 1984, he was elected as an assemblyman to the Regular Batasang Pambansa. After the People Power Revolution in 1986, Mitra joined the Aquino administration and was appointed as Agriculture Minister.

Speaker of the House (1987–1992) 
After the restoration of the House of Representatives, he ran for the second district of Palawan. He was eventually elected as Speaker of the House at its inaugural session. During his sterling leadership of the House, major bills were passed into laws of the country and instituted policies, aimed at enhancing the functions of the House as a legislative institution.

1992 presidential campaign
In 1991, Mitra, who was also the party president of the LDP, was selected in a party convention as the candidate for President of the Philippines, defeating Defense Secretary Fidel V. Ramos for the nomination. Ramos left the LDP and formed his own party, the Lakas ng Tao Party. Mitra's bid was difficult because he was branded as a "traditional politician" and suffered many controversies, including the alleged use of the congressional printing press for his election materials. Mitra ultimately lost the 1992 presidential election to Ramos.

A television film based on Mitra's life was planned to be directed by Lupita Kashiwahara, written by Baby Nebrida, and star Cesar Montano.

Later career
In 1995, he agreed to create a coalition with Ramos and formed the Lakas-Laban Coalition. In the 1995 Philippine general election, he ran for senator but lost. In the 1998 general election, he returned to the political spotlight as a key supporter of Joseph Estrada's successful presidential campaign. Estrada rewarded Mitra by naming him president of the state-owned Philippine National Oil Corporation.

Personal life
Popularly known as "Monching", he married Cecilia Aldeguer Blanco in April 1959 and had six sons. The third son, Ramon III, graduated from the Philippine Military Academy in 1988 and served in the Philippine Marine Corps before running for senator in the 2010 elections. The fourth son, Bernardo, has been working for government in various capacities since 1989. The youngest son, Abraham Kahlil, was the governor of Palawan from 2010 to 2013. He had an illegitimate son, Raul, who is a composer and songwriter.

During a night rally of farmers and fishermen in the midst of the 1992 presidential elections, he told his story about his poor life:

With that, Mitra confessed he was born out of wedlock, reared barefoot and hungry, who caught crocodiles as a youth and was shunned by his affluent father.

He had a lifelong involvement with cattle. He was chairman of the Farm Management Enterprises Corporation which owned and operated farm cattle ranches and was a breeder of gamecocks, thoroughbred horses, and cattle. When he conceded defeat in the 1992 presidential race, he found solace within the fences of his ranch and after which, continued to live his life as a farmer.

Mitra died at the Makati Medical Center from liver cancer on March 20, 2000, at the age of 72. One of his last requests was to be buried beside a lighthouse in Palawan with simple funeral rites. In one of his last interviews, he said "the lighthouse overlooks the ocean where all boats entering and leaving Puerto Princesa Bay pass by. By making that my final resting place, I can continuously guide and protect my people."

A building was named after him serving as the West Wing in the Batasang Pambansa Complex in Quezon City.

References

External links
 House of Representatives of the Philippines
 PCSD pays tribute to the father (Ramon Mitra Jr.) and author of SEP (Strategic Environmental Plan) R.A. 7611

|-

|-

|-

|-

|-

|-

1928 births
2000 deaths
20th-century Filipino lawyers
Candidates in the 1992 Philippine presidential election
Corazon Aquino administration cabinet members
Deaths from cancer in the Philippines
Filipino democracy activists
Filipino Roman Catholics
Laban ng Demokratikong Pilipino politicians
Marcos martial law victims
Members of the Batasang Pambansa
Members of the House of Representatives of the Philippines from Palawan
Minority leaders of the House of Representatives of the Philippines
People from Puerto Princesa
San Beda University alumni
Secretaries of Agriculture of the Philippines
Senators of the 7th Congress of the Philippines
Speakers of the House of Representatives of the Philippines